Edward Thomas Allington (24 June 1951 – 21 September 2017) was a British artist and sculptor, best known for his part in the 1980s New British Sculpture movement.

Born at Troutbeck Bridge, Westmorland, to Ralph Allington and his wife, Evelyn, Allington studied at Lancaster College of Art from 1968 to 1971, at the Central School of Art and Design in London from 1971 to 1974 and at the Royal College of Art from 1983 to 1984. He was a fellow at Exeter College of Art and Design 1975–77. He won the John Moores Liverpool Exhibition Prize in 1989, was Gregory Fellow in Sculpture at University of Leeds 1991–93 and Research Fellow in Sculpture at Manchester Metropolitan University in 1993. He received a fine art award to work at the British School at Rome in 1997.

His work was included in the group exhibition 'Objects and Sculpture' at the Institute of Contemporary Arts in 1981 and 'The Sculpture Show' at The Hayward Gallery 1983. He exhibited widely in America, Japan and Europe.

Allington's work was influenced by his interest in the classical world of Greece and Rome and often included references to architectural details and ancient artefacts.
His illusionistic drawings were often created on found ledgers and used oblique projection.
He exhibited in museums and art galleries throughout the world and is represented in major national and international collections.
Allington lived and worked in London and was a Professor and Head of Graduate Sculpture at Slade School of Fine Art, University College London.

Major collections
The Tate Gallery
The Victoria and Albert Museum
The Irish Museum of Modern Art
The Nagoya Prefectural Museum, Japan
Leeds Art Gallery, Leeds

Public works
Fallender Tempel (Falling Temple), ca. 1990, Saarbrücken, Römerbrücke Power Plant  
Fallen Pediment (Piano) 1994 Cass Sculpture Foundation, Goodwood, West Sussex
The Tilted Vase 1998 Ramsbottom Greater Manchester
Three Doors, One Entrance 1999 Milton Keynes Theatre foyer. Milton Keynes
Cochlea 2000 Jesus College, Cambridge
The Algorithm 2005 University College Hospital, London

Publications

References

External links

 Edward Allington on Artcyclopedia
 Official website 
 Tate profile 
 Megan Piper Gallery
 Frieze writings
 Frieze obituary
 Henry Moore Institute tribute
 The Guardian obituary 
 The Times obituary

1951 births
2017 deaths
Academics of the Slade School of Fine Art
Alumni of the Central School of Art and Design
Alumni of the Royal College of Art
English sculptors
English male sculptors
20th-century British sculptors
21st-century sculptors
People from Windermere, Cumbria
English contemporary artists